Central Upper Nile was a state in South Sudan that existed between January 2017 and 22 February 2020.

References

States of South Sudan